Chrom is a fictional character in the video game Fire Emblem Awakening and its related Fire Emblem franchise. Chrom is the prince of the Kingdom of Ylisse, and a descendant of Marth. He is the brother of Lissa and Emmeryn, and the father of Lucina. He is in charge of the state-sponsored militia force known as The Shepherds investigating the actions of an enemy state. He is the wielder of the legendary Falchion. Chrom has also appeared in other games in the Fire Emblem series, as well as appearances in crossover video games like Project X Zone 2, Tokyo Mirage Sessions ♯FE and Super Smash Bros. Ultimate. He is voiced by Tomokazu Sugita in Japanese, and by Matthew Mercer in English.

One of the most popular characters in the Fire Emblem franchise, Chrom has received a mostly positive reception from reviewers for his appearances in Awakening and related spin-off games, with praise focusing on his appearance and personality. His subsequent inclusion and appearance in Super Smash Bros. Ultimate was met with a mixed reception.

Characteristics
Chrom is noted for his white cape and signature weapon, the Falchion sword. He is described as "princely, noble, kinda dumb, really pretty", and "just a good guy" with "a bit of a temper", who has the best interests of his people at heart. Chrom's "fearsome nature in battle" is driven by his "steadfast sense of justice", which makes him a "powerful fighter, leader, and ally". Within the series, Chrom has close ties with his daughter Lucina as well as sister Lissa.

For his appearance in Super Smash Bros. Ultimate, Chrom is described as an "Echo" character who is unique. This is because his move set is not a direct copy of another character, but consists of a mixture of moves between Ike and Roy, predominantly from the latter's move set for Smash 4. He has access to a unique "Final Smash" ability called Awakening Aether which is based on his moveset in Awakening.

Development

Concept art and sketches for most of the characters in Awakening, including Chrom, were done by character designer Yusuke Kozaki. American actor Matthew Mercer, who is the English voice actor for Chrom, auditioned for the role; he claimed that while the project's title was "secret on the audition sides", he recognized the Fire Emblem series' art and character references and was hopeful in securing the role. He described his approach to playing Chrom as maintaining a "balance between casual, cool, stoic, and occasionally playful", and that he wanted players to be able to identify with the character, and vicariously enjoy his heroics. Mercer described Chrom as intelligent and capable of making good and sensible decisions, noting that he is prepared to face any challenges he encounters in spite of his youth.

In July 2014, Super Smash Bros. series director Masahiro Sakurai explained that Chrom was not included as a playable character in Super Smash Bros. for Nintendo 3DS and Wii U because he did not possess any unique characteristics and would end up being another sword-wielder like Marth and Ike. Chrom is later included in Super Smash Bros. Ultimate as he was widely requested by both Japanese and overseas fans.

In an interview with two members of the development team for Fire Emblem Warriors conducted by Japanese magazine Nintendo Dream, producer Yosuke Hayashi and director Hiroya Usuda revealed that Chrom was the first character created for the game, he and was used as a reference for how every other character in Warriors should be done. Usuda explained that the team wanted to improve the graphics for Heroes to a level of quality which matches the pre-rendered cinematic scenes as seen in Fire Emblem Awakening and Fire Emblem Fates; since there are existing character models for Chrom in the aforementioned games, the team could match his movements and actions during battle sequences, as well as character poses in box art and other illustrations. As Chrom is a sword-wielding Lord character, he also has a standard position action-wise, and many of the game's featured characters happened to bear swords as their weapon type. The team decided to prioritize development for Chrom, a process which was described as "hectic", and the finished character became the starting point for the team in deciding the direction and the skeletal frame of the cast of characters in Warriors. The decision on which characters who originate from Awakening to choose for inclusion in Warriors is contingent on whether they have close ties with Chrom, and the same is true for characters drawn from other games in the series with their respective protagonists.

Appearances

In Fire Emblem Awakening
Chrom originates from the Nintendo and Intelligent Systems video game Fire Emblem Awakening, an entry in their long-running Fire Emblem series of video games. Chrom is the leader of his personal army where he leads his shepherds. Chrom found Lucina where she travels back in time from a world of ruins where she helps Chrom, work towards in a different future. Chrom performs Awakening a ritual that grants him Naga's power, by combining the Fire Emblem with five magical gems divided among the nations. During and after the war in Valm, the Shepherds manage to retrieve four of the gemstones. In a race against time, Chrom performs the Awakening and summons Naga. Although Chrom now has the power to stop Grima, Naga reveals that she only has enough power to put Grima to sleep for another thousand years. Naga explains that the only way to truly destroy Grima is to have him destroy himself through the Avatar, which could come at cost of the Avatar's life. Naga tells them that the Avatar will only survive if their bonds with Chrom and the Shepherds are strong enough. In the final battle, the Shepherds manage to weaken Grima. Chrom, already set against the sacrifice of the Avatar, offers to deliver the final blow to the fell dragon. Depending on the player's final choice, the game will reach one of two different endings. If the player lets Chrom deal the final blow, Grima is put back to sleep for another thousand years, though the Avatar is left with regrets. If the player stops Chrom from dealing the final blow, the Avatar will kill Grima, causing both to vanish. For the inspiration of Chrom's voice, Matthew Mercer stated that he wanted his voice to be cool and stoic, but also casual and a bit playful.

Other appearances
Chrom appears as a potential character to be acquired in the mobile tactical role-playing game Fire Emblem Heroes, and as one of the main characters in Fire Emblem Warriors. For Fire Emblem Heroes‘ monthly Legendary Hero Banner in February 2020, Chrom is featured with a redesigned appearance and is armed with a bow and arrow instead of his Falchion sword, along with a different set of abilities and skills. He also appears as a DLC Emblem in Fire Emblem Engage along with a Male Robin.

Chrom has appeared in several crossover video games as a representative character of the Fire Emblem franchise, including Project X Zone 2 and Tokyo Mirage Sessions#FE. In Tokyo Mirage Sessions, Chrom is depicted as an otherworldly being, a prince from another dimension, who is bonded with the game's lead character Itsuki Aoi after he is "purified" by Itsuki's Performa ability. A costume based on Chrom's Awakening outfit was also available as part of a cross-promotion effort in Capcom's Monster Hunter: Frontier G video game. Chrom is a playable character in 2018's Super Smash Bros. Ultimate as part of the game's core fighting cast, as an "echo fighter" to Roy, meaning he has a similar set of moves. As part of the Dragalia Lost Fire Emblem Kindred Ties event which ran from April 30, 2020, to May 11, 2020, Chrom was featured as an addition in the summoning banner.

Promotion and merchandise
Nintendo initially released an Amiibo figure of Chrom in October 2017, and later a second figure with the character's redesigned appearance as seen in Ultimate in November 2019. Fire Emblem developers Intelligent Systems intended to release a pair of limited edition collectible keychains in September 2019, one of which resembled a miniature replica of Chrom's signature weapon.

Cultural impact

Fandom
According to a questionnaire which focused on Awakening hosted by Japanese anime news website Dengeki Online in August 2012, Chrom was voted favorite male character with a tally of 11.2% by readers. Several of the character's lines were voted as among the game's most memorable phrases; his "Anything can change!" quote in particular received the most votes and is considered to be "iconic". In a North American Fire Emblem character popularity poll called "Choose Your Legends" leading up to the release of Heroes in February 2017, Chrom placed fourth place among the series' male characters. The character has inspired cosplay activities, as well as a number of works driven by fan labor, such as a mousepad depicting Chrom in a provocative and suggestive pose, and a fan mod of Super Smash Bros. Brawl created in response to Chrom's exclusion from Super Smash Bros. for Nintendo 3DS and Wii U, which replaces Marth's character model with assets for the character. Swordsmith Tony Swatton, who maintains an ongoing YouTube channel called Man at Arms, uploaded a video to his channel in December 2013 where he recreated Chrom's Falchion sword, which he noted to be the result of numerous requests from fans. The video received substantial attention from video game journalists.

Reception

Chrom has received a mostly positive reception for his appearance and characterization in Awakening. GamesRadar said that Chrom "looks and feels like a main protagonist" and is a "perfect complement" to the player's avatar character; Chrom is also noted as instrumental in the successful recruitment of several other characters due to his persuasive nature. Nadia Oxford from USGamer described the first face to face meeting between Chrom and a time-traveling Lucina as "a heart-wrenching bit of video game cinema". Heather Alexandra from Kotaku found Awakening's narrative to be "magical and inspiring"; she argued that while it is tempting to view the story of Chrom and Lucina in a reductive way and dismiss their "faith filled, positive philosophies" as "childish", "foolish naïveté", the straightforward tale of their defeat of the fell dragon is thematically important from a moral perspective. Kirk Hamilton, also from Kotaku, praised the ending sequence of Awakening as one of the most "cathartic conclusions" he has experienced in video games, emphasizing the heartfelt interactions between Chrom and several other characters from the game's cast in particular. Hamilton also found the depiction of romantic content in Awakening to be "adorable", and highlighted an intimate conversation between Chrom and comrade Sumia as an example. Polygon staff ranked him as one of their "69 biggest crushes of the last decade" and described him to be very appealing, physically and emotionally. Commenting on the ongoing standings of "Choose Your Legends", Mike Fahey also from Kotaku was of the view that Chrom and Lucina should have topped the poll instead of the eventual winners, Ike and Lyn.

In her review of Fire Emblem Warriors, Meghan Sullivan from IGN praised the references which are incorporated into interactions between characters who originated from the same game, such as Chrom's reunion with Robin, the player's avatar from Awakening. Mike Sounders from Destructoid observed that Chrom's importance to Warriors is comparable to Link's role in Hyrule Warriors. Chris Moyse, also from Destructoid, was surprised that Chrom's Legendary Hero incarnation in Heroes is presented as an archer instead of a swordsman and without his signature Falchion sword. On the other hand, Steven Hansen from Destructoid expressed a dislike for the character. He criticized Chrom's inclusion as a DLC character for Fates in 2015, calling him a "stalwart bore" while expressing a preference for some of the series' lesser known characters, and emphasized that he is not a worthwhile romance option.

Chrom has also received coverage for his appearances in media outside of the Fire Emblem series, most notably the Super Smash Bros. series. Jason Schreier commented in a post published by Kotaku in July 2014 that while Chrom did appear in a promotional trailer for Super Smash Bros. for Nintendo 3DS and Wii U, "sadly, he appears to be an assist trophy or Final Smash for Robin, not a playable character". Cody Perez from VGR.com questioned the rationale behind Lucina's inclusion in the Smash series being prioritized over Chrom, and argued that he played a more prominent role within the narrative of Awakening.

While the decision to include Chrom in Ultimate was attributed by Sakurai to recurring demand from the series' fanbase, Cecilia D'Anastasio complained in a 2018 article written for Kotaku that he is too similar to other sword-wielding Fire Emblem characters who have already appeared in the Super Smash Bros. series, and that the character "is the straw that broke the camel's back", a metaphor she used to describe her exasperation at the perceived overrepresentation of Fire Emblem characters and alleged that the series is being turned into a "Fire Emblem fan game". In an edition of Weekly Famitsu published in the first week of February 2020, Sakurai admitted that there are too many Fire Emblem characters in Ultimate, and in particular too many swordsmen types. Jeremy Parish of Polygon ranked 73 fighters from Super Smash Bros. Ultimate "from garbage to glorious", placing Chrom at 69th, while Gavin Jasper of Den of Geek ranked the Chrom as 71st on his list of Super Smash Bros. Ultimate characters. Both Parish and Jasper criticized the lack of originality behind Chrom's inclusion in Ultimate as well as his overt similarity to other Fire Emblem characters. According to ZeRo, a seasoned Super Smash Bros. player and top streamer for Super Smash Bros. Ultimate in December 2018, following the 1.20 Smash patch Chrom improved from being one of the worst characters in the game to second-best in a tier list he proposed, which presented the first comprehensive and analytical ranking for playable characters in Ultimate.

Further reading

References

Male characters in video games
Fictional swordfighters in video games
Nintendo protagonists
Role-playing video game characters
Super Smash Bros. fighters
Video game characters introduced in 2012
Fictional characters displaced in time
Fictional war veterans
Fire Emblem characters
Prince characters in video games
Video game protagonists